West Kowloon is the western part of Kowloon Peninsula in Hong Kong, situated within the Yau Tsim Mong District and Sham Shui Po District. It is bounded by Canton Road to the east, Victoria Harbour to the west and the south, and Jordan Road to the north. Further to the north, the area extends to Tai Kok Tsui to the west of the West Kowloon Highway. Nam Cheong, Olympic, Austin and Kowloon stations are within the area.

West Kowloon Reclamation 
It is principally a stretch of reclaimed land, which was subsequently developed in the late 20th century. It has been zoned for mixed commercial, residential and leisure development, and was almost doubled in size with a large reclamation scheme as part of the Airport Core Programme.

Structures

Existing 

 West Kowloon Waterfront Promenade
 West Kowloon Corridor - a bypass connecting Lai Chi Kok Road with the Gascoigne Road Flyover in Yau Ma Tei
 Western Harbour Crossing - Hong Kong's third harbour crossing, the Kowloon portal of which is located within West Kowloon
 Kowloon station, Austin station, Olympic station and Nam Cheong station of MTR
 Hong Kong West Kowloon railway station - Hong Kong's high speed rail terminal connecting to mainland China.
 International Commerce Centre - the current tallest building in Hong Kong

Under construction 
 West Kowloon Cultural District - leisure and cultural district
 Central Kowloon Route Yau Ma Tei interchange

Projects

Existing 
Commercial projects include International Commerce Centre, a  skyscraper which is part of the Union Square project.

Residential projects which have been realised in the sector include The Waterfront (2000), Sorrento (2003), The Harbourside (2003), and The Arch (2005), and The Cullinan (2008, the tallest residential building in Hong Kong). The above all sit atop Kowloon MTR station, a station on the Tung Chung line and Airport Express line. The shopping-mall Elements started operating on 1 October 2007.

Plots auctioned 
In August 2005, two neighbouring sites near Central Park and Park Avenue were triggered for auction, and were subsequently acquired by a joint venture of Sino Land, Chinese Estates Holdings and Nan Fung Development.

In May 2007, a site bounded by Hoi Wang Road, Yan Cheung Road and Yau Cheung Road was won by a consortium comprising Sino Land, Chinese Estates Holdings, K Wah International and Nan Fung Development, for a bid of HK$4 billion. Following the successful auction of the site, some legislators called for a law to stop developers from constructing tall buildings which maximise good views at the expense of air flow in densely populated areas, but the bid failed.

References 

 
Restricted areas of Hong Kong red public minibus